Aleksei Gorinov ( Russian: Алексей Александрович Горинов ; born June 26, 1961) is a deputy of Moscow's Krasnoselsky District Council and a qualified lawyer who was sentenced to seven years in prison for speaking out against a proposal to hold a children's dance and drawing competition despite the ongoing Russian invasion of Ukraine. It was the first court sentence in years under tough new laws introduced by Russia in the early days of the invasion. Gorinov was the first convict who did not admit his guilt in protest against this invasion.The formal charge was "deliberate dissemination of false information". The defense attorney believes that the sentence is so harsh because the accused did not admit his guilt and did not show remorse.

The statement took place during a discussion with opposition deputy Elena Kotenochkina, when Gorinov said "children are dying". Similar charges were brought against this deputy, and she hastily left Russia. She called Russia a "fascist state." Gorinov was arrested in 2022. at the end of April.

The announced sentence was met with applause in support of Gorinov, after which his supporters were taken out of the courtroom.

in 2023 At the beginning of the year, 34 members of the European Parliament (including representatives of Lithuania) signed an open letter supporting Gorinov. At the end of January of that year, Gorinov wrote a letter to Patriarch Kirill, stating that it would be appropriate for the saint to disapprove of the ongoing war in Ukraine, instead of supporting it (Don't you sometimes betray God with your silence ).

He is currently in prison in Corrective colony No. 2, Vladimir Oblast.

References 

1961 births
Living people
Russian jurists
CS1 errors: URL
Russian political prisoners
Russian prisoners and detainees
Russian dissidents
Russian activists against the 2022 Russian invasion of Ukraine